The first aeronautical event in Arkansas was the flight of a balloon around 1870 in Yell county. The first heavier than air flight was by James C. “Bud” Mars on 21 May 1910.

Events 
July 1930, Walter Herschel Beech, founder of Beechcraft has an offer rejected to build a factory in Arkansas City, Arkansas, instead building the company in Wichita, Kansas.
September 19, 1980, a major mishap occurred after a socket rolled off a platform and punctured a Titan II Stage I fuel tank, subsequently causing the entire silo to explode, killing an Air Force airman, SrA David Livingston, and destroying the silo near Damascus, Arkansas.  A "B" grade television movie portrays this event, "Disaster at Silo 7".
1 April 1981 Arkansas native, J. Lynn Helms is appointed as director of the FAA, serving through the 1981 Controller strike

Aircraft Manufacturers 
Dassault Aviation maintains a final assembly facility in Little Rock, Arkansas for its Falcon series of jets.

Aerospace

Airports 

 List of Airports in Arkansas

Commercial Service

Organizations 
 The Arkansas Aerospace Alliance is part of the Arkansas Economic Development Commission.

Government and Military

All flight operations in Arkansas are conducted within FAA oversight.
The Arkansas Department of Aeronautics was founded in 1966.

Museums 
Arkansas Air & Military Museum, Fayetteville, Arkansas
Fort Smith Air Museum, Fort Smith, Arkansas

References 

 
Transportation in Arkansas